This article lists events that occurred during 1921 in Estonia.

Incumbents

Events
 Estonia joins League of Nations.
 Tallinn French School was founded.

Births
11 December – Ilmar Laaban, Estonian writer

Deaths

References

 
1920s in Estonia
Estonia
Estonia
Years of the 20th century in Estonia